The Central European Blue Chip Index (CETOP) is a stock market index which reflects the performance of the companies with the biggest market value and turnover in the Central European region.

The aim of the CETOP index is to serve as a benchmark for the portfolio managers who invest in the region. Blue chip equities of the Central European region are included in the index basket selected on the basis of global ranking, taking into account that a maximum of 7 securities from one stock exchange may be simultaneously included in the index. The index is reviewed twice a year, in March and September.

The eligible securities are those shares that are listed on at least one of the following Exchanges:

Budapest Stock Exchange
Warsaw Stock Exchange
Prague Stock Exchange
Bratislava Stock Exchange
Ljubljana Stock Exchange
Zagreb Stock Exchange
Bucharest Stock Exchange

Components

See also
Economy of Hungary
Economy of Budapest
List of companies of Hungary
List of European stock exchanges
List of stock exchange opening times
Hungarian National Bank (Securities and exchange surveillance)
New York Stock Exchange

References

External links
 Index composition

European stock market indices
Finance in Hungary
Economy of Budapest